Farid Al-Harbi (born February 18, 1990) is a Saudi football player who plays as a striker .

References

1990 births
Living people
Saudi Arabian footballers
Al-Tai FC players
Al-Nahda Club (Saudi Arabia) players
Al-Hazem F.C. players
Al-Wehda Club (Mecca) players
Al-Ain FC (Saudi Arabia) players
Al-Washm Club players
Place of birth missing (living people)
Saudi First Division League players
Saudi Professional League players
Saudi Second Division players
Association football forwards